David Thomas Jukes (born 24 May 1956 in Shoreham-by-Sea, Sussex) is a Match referee from England. He made his International debut when Ireland cricket team played against Kenya cricket team at Dublin in July 2009. He member of match referee chosen by the International Cricket Council as part of ICC Regional Referees to officiate associate and affiliate members rather than its full members.

See also

 Elite Panel of ICC Referees
 List of One Day International cricket umpires
 List of Twenty20 International cricket umpires

References

1956 births
Living people
People from Shoreham-by-Sea
Cricket match referees